Kantilal H. Sancheti (born 24 July 1936) is an orthopaedic physician who invented India's first indigenous knee implant, the Indus Knee, and founder of Maharashtra's first orthopaedic dedicated specialty hospital.

Early life
Sancheti was  born in a Shewtamber Jain family. He holds the academic degrees and fellowships of M.S. (Ortho), F.R.C.S (Edinburgh) U.K., Ph.D (Ortho), F.I.C.S., F.A.C.S. (U.S.A.).

Career
Founder Director and Chief Orthopaedic Surgeon,  at Sancheti Institute for Orthopaedics and Rehabilitation (SIOR). SIOR is a hospital specialising in Joint Replacement, Traumatology, Spinal Surgery, Paediatrics, Orthopaedic, Arthroscopy and Sports Injuries, Hand and Plastic Surgery.
Chairman, Post Graduate Institute of Orthopaedics, Post Graduate Institute for Physiotherapy and Hospital Management.
Hon. Orthopaedic Surgeon to the Governor of Maharashtra and Indian Armed Forces.
Hon. Professor, Examiner, and member of several high level core committees of various universities and Health Care related committees of Government of Maharashtra and Medical Council of India.
President Indian Orthopaedic Association and Past President of Maharashtra Orthopaedic Association.
Professor Emeritus in Orthopaedics, Chief Orthopaedic Surgeon, Sancheti Hospital & Centre for Joint Replacement Surgery, Pune.

Awards 
The Government of India presented him with its highest civilian awards: the Padma Shri in 1991, the Padma Bhushan in 2001 and the Padma Vibhushan in 2012.

Maharana Mewar Award by the Maharana Mewar Foundation - 2003
Fellowship of the Royal College of Surgeons, Edinburg, United Kingdom - 2004
Lifetime Achievement award of The International Medical Integration Council from the Government of Maharashtra - 2004
International Award for Medical Excellence by Harvard Medical School (USA) - 2005
Jeevan Sadhana Gaurav Puraskar by Pune University 2010 

He organized over 500 health camps for handicapped children all over India. Sancheti also acted in the capacity of hospital design consultant to over 120 hospitals in India.

References 

Recipients of the Padma Vibhushan in medicine
Indian surgeons
1936 births
Recipients of the Padma Shri in social work
Recipients of the Padma Bhushan in medicine
Living people
20th-century Indian medical doctors
Scientists from Pune
Medical doctors from Maharashtra
20th-century surgeons